Lạc Sơn is a rural district of Hòa Bình province in the Northwest region of Vietnam. As of 2019, the district had a population of 136,652. The district covers an area of 580 km2. The district capital lies at Vụ Bản.

Administrative divisions
Lạc Sơn is divided into 24 commune-level sub-divisions, including the township of Vụ Bản and 23 rural communes (Ân Nghĩa, Bình Hẻm, Chí Đạo, Định Cư, Hương Nhượng, Miền Đồi, Mỹ Thành, Ngọc Lâu, Ngọc Sơn, Nhân Nghĩa, Quý Hòa, Quyết Thắng, Tân Lập, Tân Mỹ, Thượng Cốc, Tự Do, Tuân Đạo, Văn Nghĩa, Văn Sơn, Vũ Bình, Xuất Hóa, Yên Nghiệp, Yên Phú).

References

Districts of Hòa Bình province
Hòa Bình province